Charles Latour Rogier (17 August 1800 – 27 May 1885) was a Belgian liberal statesman and a leader in the Belgian Revolution of 1830. He served as the prime minister of Belgium on two occasions: from 1847 to 1852, and again from 1857 to 1868.

Career

Early life
Rogier was descended from a family settled in the department of the Nord in France, and was born in Saint-Quentin. His father, an officer in the French army, perished in the Russian Campaign of 1812. The family then moved to the Belgian city of Liège, where the eldest son, Firmin, held a professorship. Rogier studied law at the University of Liège and was admitted to the Bar. However, he devoted himself with greater zeal to journalistic campaigns against the Dutch rule in Belgium, which had been established by the Congress of Vienna in 1815. In 1824, in collaboration with his lifelong friends Paul Devaux and Joseph Lebeau, he founded the journal Mathieu Laensberg (afterwards Le Politique). With its ardent patriotism and its attacks on the Dutch administration, the journal soon achieved widespread influence.

On the outbreak of the insurrection at Brussels in August 1830, Rogier went there with a militia of about 300 citizens from Liège. In Brussels he gained recognition as one of the most active among the patriot leaders, and his influence saved the town hall from pillage on 19 September. In October Rogier was also sent to suppress an outbreak among the colliers of Hainaut Province.

Political rise

Rogier became a member of the provisional government established in October of the same year. He succeeded in arranging an armistice, and then reorganized the entire administration of Antwerp. He represented Liège in the Belgian National Congress, voted for the establishment of a hereditary monarchy, and induced the congress to adopt the principle of an elective second chamber. In the long-drawn debates on the bestowal of the crown he ranged himself on the side of Louis Philippe: he first supported the candidature of prince Otto of Bavaria, and on his rejection declared for Louis Philippe's son duc de Nemours, whose candidacy was declined by Louis.

After the eventual election of Leopold I as King in June 1831, Rogier was made Governor of Antwerp, a post rendered difficult by the continued presence of Dutch troops in the citadel. In October 1832 he was made minister of the interior in the Goblet cabinet. In June 1833 he intervened in a quarrel in the chamber of deputies between Paul Devaux, then a minister, and the opposition leader, Alexandre Gendebien, and fought a duel in which he was severely wounded. During his term of office he carried, in the teeth of violent opposition, a law that established in Belgium the first railways on the continent of Europe, and thus laid the foundation of her industrial development. Owing to dissensions in the cabinet, he retired in 1834, together with Lebeau, and resumed the governorship of Antwerp.

When Lebeau returned to power in 1840, Rogier became Minister of Public Works and Education. His educational reform proposals were defeated, and when the ministry resigned in 1841 he supported a compromise that passed into law the next year. He then led the Liberal party in Opposition until 1847, when he formed a cabinet in which he was Minister of the Interior. He at once embarked on a programme of political and economic reform, and took effective steps to remedy the industrial distress caused by the decay of the Flemish linen trade. The limits of the franchise were extended, and as the result of the liberal policy of the government Belgium alone escaped the revolutionary wave that spread over the Continent in 1848. He passed a law in 1850 organizing secondary education under the control of the State, and giving the clergy only the right of religious instruction. The opposition Clerical party, though unable to defeat this measure, succeeded in shaking the position of the cabinet; and it was finally undermined, after Louis Napoleon's coup d'état of 1851, by the hostility of the French government, whose political exiles had been welcomed by the liberal cabinet at Brussels.

Rogier retired in October 1852, but was brought back into office by the liberal reaction of 1857. He again became president of the council and minister of the interior in a cabinet of which Walthère Frère-Orban was the most conspicuous member. The first important measure passed by the ministry was one for the fortification of Antwerp. In 1860 the fear of French designs on the independence of Belgium led to a movement of reconciliation with the Netherlands, and in the same year Belgium adopted La Brabançonne as its national anthem, with words adapted by Rogier from an existing poem.

From 1861, Rogier served as Minister for Foreign Affairs. In this capacity he achieved a diplomatic triumph in freeing the navigation of the river Scheldt, thus enabling Antwerp to become the second port on the mainland of Europe. Electorally defeated at Dinant, he represented Tournai from 1863, a post he held until his death.

Later life
By now his younger colleague, Frère-Orban, gradually overshadowed his chief, and in 1868 Rogier finally retired from power. He continued, however, to take part in public life, and was elected president of the extraordinary session of the chamber of representatives in 1878, but was replaced by Jules Guillery later the same year. The fiftieth anniversary of the kingdom of Belgium in 1880, and two years later that of his entry into parliament, were the occasion of demonstrations in his honour. He died at Brussels on 27 May 1885, and his remains were accorded a public funeral.

Legacy
Today, one of Brussels' central squares, the Place Charles Rogier/Karel Rogierplein, is named in is honour.

Honours 
 : 
 Minister of State, By Royal decree.
 Iron Cross.
 Grand Cordon in the Order of Leopold.
: Grand Cross in the Austrian Imperial Order of Leopold
 : Knight Grand Cross in the Legion of Honour.
 : Knight Grand Cross in the Order of Saints Maurice and Lazarus.
 : Knight Grand Cross in the Order of the Netherlands Lion.
 : Grand Cross in the Order of the Immaculate Conception of Vila Viçosa.
 : Knight Grand Cross in the Imperial Order of the White Eagle.
 : Knight Grand Cross in the Order of Charles III.
 : Grand Cross in the Order of the Polar Star.
 : Grand Cross in the Saxe-Ernestine House Order.
 : Grand Cross in the Order of the Red Eagle.

Gallery

Publications

See also
List of prime ministers of Belgium
Liberalism in Belgium

References

Notes

Bibliography

External links
 
 

|-

|-

|-

|-

1800 births
1885 deaths
Prime Ministers of Belgium
Governors of Antwerp Province
19th-century Belgian politicians
Belgian journalists
Male journalists
Belgian Ministers of State
Belgian people of French descent
Liberal Party (Belgium) politicians
Members of the National Congress of Belgium
People from Antwerp Province
People from Saint-Quentin, Aisne
Presidents of the Chamber of Representatives (Belgium)
University of Liège alumni
People of the Belgian Revolution

Knights Grand Cross of the Order of Saints Maurice and Lazarus
Grand Croix of the Légion d'honneur
Order of the Polar Star
Knights Grand Cross of the Order of the Immaculate Conception of Vila Viçosa
19th-century French journalists
French male journalists
19th-century male writers
National anthem writers